The Yong'an Fishing Port, formerly known as Kantouwu Port,  is a fishing port in Xinwu District, Taoyuan City, Taiwan.

Architecture
The port is located at the estuary of Shezu Creek. It features fish market designed with a shape of a lobster and the Yongan Seaview Bridge.

Transportation
The port is accessible by bus from Zhongli Station of Taiwan Railways.

See also
 Port of Taichung

References

Ports and harbors of Taoyuan